Metropolitan France contains a total of  of tree coverage, with  considered to be forestry by the National Forest Inventory (IFN).  Of those ,  consist of leafy forests while the remaining  consist of evergreen forests.

The majority of forestry in French overseas departments is found in French Guiana, which contains  of forests.

 of forests in France are publicly owned, with the remaining  being privately owned.

The largest forests in France by region are as follows:

Alsace
 Forêt de la Hardt (or de la Harth) (130 km²)
 Forêt du Donon 
 Forêt de Haguenau (137 km²)
 Forêt d'Obernai
 Forêt de Sélesta-Illwald (15 km²)

Aquitaine
 Forêt d'Iraty (173 km²)
 Forêt des Landes (10,000 km²)
 Forêt de Lège et Garonne

Auvergne
 Forêt de Gros-Bois
 Forêt de Marigny
 Forêt de Messarges
 Forêt des Prieurés Maladier 
 Forêt de Tronçais (106 km²)

Brittany
 Forêt de Brocéliande
 Forêt de Carnoët
 Forêt de Coëtquen
 Forêt du Cranou
 Forêt de Fougères (16 km²)
 Forêt de Fréau
 Forêt de Huelgoat (6 km²)
 Forêt de Hunaudaye
 Forêt de La Guerche
 Forêt de Liffré 
 Forêt de Mesnil
 Forêt de Paimpont (80 km²)
 Forêt de Rennes in Liffré 
 Forêt de Saint-Aubin-du-Cormier
 Forêt de Lanouée (32 km², private)

Burgundy
 Forêt d'Arcy
 Forêt de la Bertrange  (76 km²)
 Forêt de Borne
 Forêt de Champornot
 Forêt de Châtillon (88 km²)
 Forêt Chenue
 Forêt domaniale de Cîteaux (35 km²)
 Forêt des Courgeonneries, Forêt des Dames
 Forêt de Donzy
 Forêt de Flavigny
 Forêt de Fontenay
 Forêt des Minimes
 Forêt de Saulieu
 Forêt de Vauluisant, also known as the Forêt de Lancy

Centre
 Forêt d'Amboise
 Forêt de Bercé (55 km²)
 Forêt de Blois
 Forêt de Boulogne (40 km²)
 Forêt de Bruadan
 Parc de Chambord
 Forêt de Chaumont
 Forêt de Cheverny
 Forêt de Chinon
 Forêt du Choussy
 Forêt de Gâtine
 Forêt d'Ivoy
 Forêt de Loches
 Forêt de Moléans
 Forêt de Montargis
 Forêt de Montrichard
 Forêt d'Orléans (340 km²)
 Forêt de Preuilly
 Forêt de Russy
 Forêt de Saint-Palais
 Forêt de Vierzon
 Forêt de Villandry
 Forêt de Vouzeron

Champagne-Ardenne
 Bois des Fays
 Bois des Montclaims
 Forêt d'Arc-en-Barrois (100 km²)
 Forêt d'Argonne
 Forêt des Ardennes
 Forêt de Bassican
 Forêt de Clairvaux
 Forêt de Corgebin
 Forêt du Der
 Forêt des Dhuits
 Forêt de l'Étoile
 Forêt de La Garenne
 Forêt de la Montagne de Reims (190 km²)
 Forêt du Mont-Dieu
 Forêt d'Orient (130 km²)
 Forêt d'Othe (155 km²)
 Forêt de Retz (130 km²)
 Forêt de Romilly
 Forêt d'Aumont
 Forêt de Crogny
 Forêt de Cussangy
 
 Bois de Chamois
 Bois du Hayet
 Forêt du Temple
 Forêt de Signy
 Forêt du Val

Corsica
 Forêt d'Aïtone
 Forêt de Calenzana
 Forêt de Chiavari
 Forêt du Fango, Forêt de Lucio
 Forêt de Filosorma
 Forêt de l'Onca
 Forêt de l'Ospédale
 Forêt de Tartagine
 Forêt de Tavignano
 Forêt de Valdo-Niello
 Forêt de Vizzavona (14 km²)
 Forêt de Zonza

Franche-Comté
 Forêt de Champlitte
 Forest of Chaux (130 km²)
 Forêt de Faroz
 Forêt des Hauts-Bois
 Forêt de la Joux (27 km²)

Île-de-France
 Bois de Boulogne
 Bois de la Tour du Lay
 Bois de Villiers, Bois de la Bucaille
 Bois de Vincennes
 Forest of Alluets
 Forest of Armainvilliers (50 km²)
 Forest of Carnelle (9.75 km²)
 Forest of Fontainebleau (250 km²)
 Forest of l'Isle-Adam (15 km²)
 Forest of Jouy
 Forest of Marly (20 km²)
 Forest of Meudon 
 Forest of Moisson
 Forest of Montmorency (22 km²)
 Forest of Notre-Dame 
 Forest of Rambouillet (220 km²)
 Forest of Rouvray
 Forest of Saint-Germain-en-Laye (35 km²)
 Forest of Sénart (30 km²)

Languedoc-Roussillon 
 Bois de Fontanilles
 Forêt de Fontfroide
 Forêt du Haut-Vallespir (100 km²)
 Forêt de Mercoire
 Forêt du Mont-Aigoual (150 km²)

Limousin
 Forêt des Cars
 Forêt de Lastours
 Forêt de Châteauneuf
 Forêt de Rochechouart
 Forêt de Viellecour

Lorraine
 Forêt de Darney (80 km²)
 Forêt de Gerardmer (48 km²)
 Forêt de Haye (70 km²)
 Forêt de Verdun (95 km²)

Midi-Pyrénées 
 Forêt d'Aubrac
 Forêt de Barousse
 Forêt de La Garrigue
 Forêt de Grésigne
 Forêt du Haut Comminges
 Forêt de la Loubatière
 Forêt de Montaud
 Forêt du Sidobre
 Forêt de Bouconne (27 km²)

Nord-Pas-de-Calais
 Forêt d'Éperlecques
 Forêt de Mormal (90 km²)
 Forêt de Raismes-Saint-Amand-Wallers

Normandy

Lower Normandy
 Forêt des Andaines (ou des Andennes) (55 km²) 
 Forêt de Bellême (24 km²)
 Forêt d'Écouves (75 km²)
 Forêt de Longny
 Forêt du Perche
 Forêt de Perseigne  (51 km²)
 Forêt de Réno-Valdieu (55.12 km²)
 Forêt de Vidamme

Upper Normandy
 Forêt des Andelys
 Forêt de Beaumont
 Forêt de Breteuil
 Forêt de Brotonne (67.5 km²)
 Forêt de Conches
 Forêt d'Eawy 
 Forêt d'Eu (93 km²)
 Forêt d'Évreux
 Forêt de Louviers
 Forêt de Lyons (106 km²)
 Forêt de Montfort
 Forêt de Roumare
 Forêt de Rouvray
 Forêt de Vernon
 Forêt Verte

Pays de la Loire
 Bois des Vallons
 Forêt de Bercé
 Forêt de Bonnétable
 Forêt de Boulogne
 Bois de Bourgon, Boi d'Hermet
 Forêt de Fontevraud, Bois de Couziers, Bois de Roiffé
 Forêt de la Flèche
 Forêt du Gâvre (45 km²)
 Forêt de la Grande Charnie
 Forêt de la Groulaie
 Forêt de Guînes
 Forêt de Juigné (21 km²)
 Forêt de La Roche-Bernard
 Forêt de Machecoul
 Forêt du Mans
 Forêt de Mayenne
 Forêt de Merven-Vouvant
 Forêt de Milly
 Forêt de Multonne
 Forêt de Nuaillé, Forêt de Vezins
 Forêt de Pail
 Forêt domaniale des Pays-de-Monts
 Forêt de Rihout-Clairmarais
 Forêt de Saumur

Picardy
 Forêt de Compiègne (145 km²)
 Forêt de Chantilly (65 km²)
 Forêt de Crécy
 Forêt d'Ermenonville, Forêt de Chailly  (64 km²)
 Forêt d'Halatte  (62 km²)
 Forêt de Hez
 Forêt de Hirson, Forêt de Saint-Michel
 Forêt de Laigne
 Forêt de Nouvion
 Forêt de Retz (130 km²)
 Forêt de Saint-Gobain

Poitou-Charentes
 Forêt de La Coubre, Forêt de Saint-Trojan
 Forêt de Saint-Sauvant

Provence-Alpes-Côte d'Azur
 Forêt des Dentelles de Montmirail
 Forêt de l'Esterel
 Forêt des Maures (80 km²)
 Forêt de Menton
 Forêt du Mont-Ventoux (800 km²)
 Forêt de la Sainte-Baume (1.4 km²)
 Forêt du Tanneron

Rhône-Alpes
 Forêt d'Arc (11225 km²)
 Forêt de Bonnevaux
 Forêt de Chambaran
 Forêt de la Grande Chartreuse (83 km²)
 Forêt de Saou (en partie domaniale)
 Forêt du Semnoz
 Forêt du Vercors

Overseas

Guadeloupe
 650 km² (390 km²)

French Guiana
74,500 km²

Martinique
 403 km²

Réunion
2512 km² 
 Forêt de Bébour
 Forêt de Bélouve
 Forêt des Bénares
 Forêt de Bois Blanc
 Forêt du Cratère
 Forêt de la Crête
 Forêt de l'Étang-Salé
 Forêt de Grand Coude
 Forêt du Grand Matarum
 Forêt des Makes
 Forêt de la Mare à Joseph
 Forêt Mourouvin
 Forêt du Piton Papangue
 Forêt de la Plaine des Lianes
 Forêt de la Rivière des Remparts
 Forêt du Tapcal
 Forêt du Tévelave
 Forêt de Villeneuve

 
France
Forests